Marine Equipment Directive 96/98/EC (also known as M.E.D. 96/98/EC and often called M.E.D/MED approval or certification in everyday language) is an authorisation of equipment and products for Marine industry. It is a Council Directive of 20. December 1996. Directive 2014/90/EU repealed Directive 96/98/EC on 18 September 2016.

Initiative of the European Commission 
M.E.D. 96/98/EC is a Council Directive of 20 December 1996 of the European Commission (EC) in the European Union (EU).

Several countries outside the EU area automatically approve and accept products with M.E.D. 96/98/EC authorisation. There is a Mutual Recognition Agreement (MRA) on Marine Equipment with the United States Coast Guard where both EU and USA will approve each other's authorised products. A continuous mutual ratification process ensures that there is alignment between the two.

The MarED database 
The MarED Product Database contains information about authorised equipment to be installed on EU flagged merchant vessels according to the European Marine Equipment Directive.
Access to the MarED Database and to the MarED website is available for the public, but limited to registered users only. The registration is free of charge.

The database contains more than 35.000 datasets about products approved under the EU Marine Equipment Directive. Also more than 5.000 datasets about products approved under the Mutual Recognition Agreement with the United States of America.

Intention 
The intention with the EU Marine Equipment Directive is to reduce costs for the end user by having a simplified model and not having unnecessary expenses by several classification societies or companies to do each their approvals of the same products. A classification society can simply do the classing process by looking up authorised products listed in the MarED database. The classification societies does classifications according to the rules and regulations of the Flag state which rules the classification.

References

External links 
 Marine Equipment Directive 96/98/EC on The MarED website
 Video: Introduction to the Marine Equipment Directive
 MarED database
 Marine Equipment Directive Certification Body – TÜV SÜD BABT

European Union directives
Maritime safety in Europe
Product safety